City and Regional Planning encompasses the following:

 "City" or "Urban" Planning
 Regional Planning

See also
 Land Use Planning
 Landscape architecture